The defect concentration diagram (also problem concentration diagram) is a graphical tool that is useful in analyzing the causes of the product or part defects. It is a drawing of the product (or other item of interest), with all relevant views displayed, onto which the locations and frequencies of various defects are shown.

Usage 
Defect concentration diagram is used effectively in the following situations:
During data collection phase of problem identification.
Analyzing a part or assembly for possible defects.
Analyzing a product (or a part of a product) being manufactured with several defects.

Steps 
There are a number of steps that are needed to be follow when constructing the defect concentration diagram:
Define the fault or faults (or whatever) being investigated.
Make a map, drawing, or picture.
Mark on the diagram each time a fault (or whatever) occurs and where it occurs.
After a sufficient period of time, analyze it to identify where the faults occur.

References

Industrial engineering
Quality control tools
Statistical charts and diagrams